Job Joël André Matip (born 8 August 1991) is a German-born Cameroonian professional footballer who plays as a centre-back for  club Liverpool. Strong and clever, Matip is particularly known for his penchant to dribble up the pitch in order to create momentum and was sometimes lauded as one of the best defenders in the world in his prime.

Matip began his professional career with Schalke 04 in 2009, and was part of their teams that won the DFB-Pokal and DFL-Supercup in 2011. He totalled 258 competitive appearances and 23 goals before moving to Liverpool on a free transfer in 2016, where he won the UEFA Champions League in 2019, starting in the final. He also won the UEFA Super Cup in 2019 and the Premier League in 2020, Liverpool's first league title in thirty years.

Born and raised in Germany, Matip represented Cameroon at international level, playing for them at the 2010 Africa Cup of Nations and the FIFA World Cups of 2010 and 2014, before announcing his international retirement in 2015.

Club career

Early career
Matip began his career with SC Weitmar 45 before joining VfL Bochum in 1997. After three years in VfL Bochum's youth teams, Matip was scouted by Schalke 04 in July 2000.

Schalke 04

Matip made his debut on 27 October 2009 in a Regionalliga West match against 1. FC Saarbrücken. He made his Bundesliga debut for Schalke on 7 November 2009 against Bayern Munich, in which he scored the game-tying goal and was subsequently named man of the match. After his successful introduction to the first team, Matip remained a regular starter for Schalke in defensive midfield for the remainder of the 2009–10 season, scoring two further goals against 1. FC Köln and Eintracht Frankfurt.

On 2 March 2010, Matip signed a three-and-a-half-year contract with Schalke 04.

In the 2010–11 season, Matip made his UEFA Champions League debut as Schalke reached the semi-finals of the competition for the first time in the club's history. On 5 April 2011, he scored his first Champions League goal in Schalke's 5–2 quarter final win against title holders Inter Milan at San Siro. 

On 21 May 2011, Matip appeared as a 72nd minute substitute in Schalke's 5–0 DFB-Pokal win over MSV Duisburg at the Berlin Olympiastadion.

In January 2012, Schalke announced that Matip signed a two-year contract extension running until June 2016.

On 23 February 2013, Matip scored both goals as Schalke recorded an important 2–1 victory over Fortuna Düsseldorf, securing the club's second win in 12 games.

Liverpool

2016–17 season
On 15 February 2016, Matip announced signing a four-year pre-contract agreement to join Liverpool on a free transfer, following the expiration of his contract with Schalke. He made his debut for Liverpool on 23 August 2016 against Burton Albion in the League Cup in a 5–0 win for the Reds. He scored his first goal for the club in a 4–2 Premier League win over Crystal Palace at Selhurst Park on 29 October. Matip was voted as Standard Chartered Player of the Month for his performances in November.

Matip was withdrawn from the fixture against Manchester United on 15 January 2017, as Liverpool were yet to get full clarity from FIFA over his eligibility, and also as a result of the Cameroon Football Federation failing to confirm that Matip can therefore play club football during the 2017 Africa Cup of Nations. Overall, Matip was considered as a key player to improving Liverpool's defence, which had received extreme criticism prior to the season, during the 2016–17 season.

2017–18 season

On 1 October 2017, Matip was criticised for his poor performance against Newcastle United, being deemed at fault for Newcastle's goal. On 4 November, Matip scored his first goal of the 2017–18 season, scoring in a 4–1 win over West Ham United at the London Stadium. On 27 January 2018, Matip scored an own goal in a 2–3 home defeat to West Bromwich Albion in the fourth round of the FA Cup. On 31 March, during the match against Crystal Palace, Matip suffered a thigh injury. On 3 April, Liverpool announced that he would have to undergo surgery to fix it, and that he will miss the rest of the season.

2018–19 season
Matip suffered another muscle injury in July 2018 during a tour of the United States, but recovered to be named an unused substitute in a 2–0 away win over Crystal Palace on 20 August.

On 13 December 2018, Matip suffered a broken collarbone after the 1–0 win against Napoli. The injury saw him miss another 6 weeks of the season. Despite the showing of interest by new Fulham manager Claudio Ranieri, Matip remained at Liverpool for the rest of the season, establishing himself in the starting eleven. On 1 June 2019, Matip assisted Divock Origi's goal in the 87th minute of the 2019 UEFA Champions League Final, which saw Liverpool defeat Tottenham Hotspur 2–0 to win the title.

2019–20 season
On 4 August 2019, Matip scored Liverpool's goal in the 2019 FA Community Shield. Liverpool lost the game 5–4 on penalties. On 24 August 2019, Matip scored his first Premier League goal of the season, opening the scoring in a 3–1 home win over Arsenal. On 18 October 2019, he signed a contract renewal until 2024. 

His 2019–20 season was plagued by injuries, and Joe Gomez quickly took his place as Jürgen Klopp's preferred centre-back to partner Virgil van Dijk. His first injury occurred in a Premier League match on 20 October 2019 against rivals Manchester United. He returned in late January 2020, making just one league start before the seasons suspension due to COVID-19. He was injured again on 21 June 2020 in a Merseyside derby against Everton, with the club later revealing he would not be able to feature for the rest of the season.

2020–21 season

On 28 January 2021, Matip was substituted at the half-time against Tottenham Hotspur. On 1 February 2021, it was revealed that he suffered ankle ligament injury and would miss the remainder of the season.

2021–22 season

On 23 February 2022, Matip scored his first goal of the 2021–22 season in a 6–0 win against Leeds United. He was named Premier League Player of the Month for February on 11 March.

2022–23 season

On 13 September 2022, Matip scored his first UEFA Champions League goal for Liverpool with a  late header in a 2–1 win against Ajax in the 2022–23 UEFA Champions League at Anfield.

International career
Matip was called up on 23 December 2009 by Cameroon for the 2010 Africa Cup of Nations but he later declined to take part in the tournament. 

On 2 March 2010, aged 18, Matip opted to play his international football for Cameroon, after meeting up with the national team ahead of a friendly against Italy on 3 March 2010. He made his first appearance in the match against Italy and went on to play in the 2010 FIFA World Cup for Cameroon. He was also part of the Cameroon squad for the 2014 FIFA World Cup where he played twice and scored against the host team Brazil, the team's only goal of the tournament. 

In January 2017, Matip was selected for the 2017 Africa Cup of Nations but rejected the call-up. It was later revealed that Matip retired from the national team when he was still at Schalke, but had not followed FIFA procedure by informing the Cameroonian Football Association via letter. While the confusion was cleared up by FIFA, Matip could not play for Liverpool. He subsequently missed a Premier League tie against Manchester United and an FA Cup third round match against Plymouth Argyle.

Matip cited his reason for his retirement was his unhappiness with the national team set up and his bad experience with the coaching staff.

Personal life
Matip was born in Bochum, North Rhine-Westphalia, to a German mother and former Cameroonian footballer Jean Matip. He is the brother of the fellow Cameroon international Marvin Matip and is a cousin of Joseph-Désiré Job. He attended the Gesamtschule Berger Feld. 

He married long-term partner Larissa Stollenwerk in the aftermath of Liverpool's 2020 Premier League title, and in June 2021 they welcomed their first child, a son.

Career statistics

Club

International

Cameroon score listed first, score column indicates score after each Matip goal

Honours
Schalke 04
DFB-Pokal: 2010–11
DFL-Supercup: 2011

Liverpool
Premier League: 2019–20
FA Cup: 2021–22
EFL Cup: 2021–22
FA Community Shield: 2022
UEFA Champions League: 2018–19; runner-up: 2021–22
UEFA Super Cup: 2019

Individual
PFA Player of the Month: September 2019
Premier League Player of the Month: February 2022
CAF Team of the Year: 2019

References

External links

Profile at the Liverpool F.C. website

1991 births
Living people
Sportspeople from Bochum
Footballers from North Rhine-Westphalia
Cameroonian footballers
German footballers
Association football defenders
FC Schalke 04 players
FC Schalke 04 II players
Liverpool F.C. players
Regionalliga players
Bundesliga players
Premier League players
FA Cup Final players
UEFA Champions League winning players
Cameroon international footballers
2010 Africa Cup of Nations players
2010 FIFA World Cup players
2014 FIFA World Cup players
Cameroonian expatriate footballers
German expatriate footballers
Expatriate footballers in England
Cameroonian expatriate sportspeople in England
German expatriate sportspeople in England
People educated at the Gesamtschule Berger Feld
Citizens of Cameroon through descent
German people of Cameroonian descent
German sportspeople of African descent
Cameroonian people of German descent
Sportspeople of Cameroonian descent